Hélène Chalifour-Scherrer,  (born July 6, 1950 in Quebec City, Quebec) is a Canadian politician.

From 2000 to 2004, she was a Member of Parliament in the House of Commons representing riding of Louis-Hébert, Quebec, as a member of the Liberal Party of Canada.

She has a Bachelor of Arts degree in social work. She has two children.

In December 2003, she was appointed Minister of Canadian Heritage by the new prime minister, Paul Martin. In the 2004 election, she was defeated by Roger Clavet of the Bloc Québécois, and replaced as heritage minister by Liza Frulla a month later.

On August 18, 2004, it was announced that she was to become Paul Martin's principal secretary, replacing Francis Fox. She held this post until the defeat of the Martin government in 2006. She ran again in that election, this time placing third behind Clavet and winner Luc Harvey.

References

External links
 

1950 births
Women members of the House of Commons of Canada
French Quebecers
Liberal Party of Canada MPs
Living people
Members of the House of Commons of Canada from Quebec
Members of the King's Privy Council for Canada
Politicians from Quebec City
Women in Quebec politics
Members of the 27th Canadian Ministry
21st-century Canadian women politicians
Women government ministers of Canada